Josef Gassner (born 19 December 1944) is a Liechtensteiner former alpine skier who competed in the 1964 Winter Olympics and in the 1968 Winter Olympics.

References

External links
 

1944 births
Living people
Liechtenstein male alpine skiers
Olympic alpine skiers of Liechtenstein
Alpine skiers at the 1964 Winter Olympics
Alpine skiers at the 1968 Winter Olympics